50PLUS (abbreviated 50+) is a political party in the Netherlands that advocates pensioners' interests. The party was founded in 2009 by Maurice Koopman, Alexander Münninghoff, and Jan Nagel. Henk Krol served as the party's leader from 2016 to 2020.

The party first participated in the 2011 provincial elections, in which it won nine seats. It currently holds sixteen seats in the provincial councils and two seats in the Senate. On 6 May 2021, Liane den Haan, the party's leader and sole representative in the House of Representatives, left 50PLUS following an internal dispute.

History

2009-2011 
The party was founded under the name Onafhankelijke Ouderen en Kinderen Unie (Independent Elderly and Children Union) in 2009, succeeding the Partij voor Rechtvaardigheid, Daadkracht en Vooruitgang (Party for Justice, Vigour and Progress). It was an initiative of Maurice Koopman, Alexander Münninghoff and Jan Nagel. The party decided not to enter elections for the House of Representatives in 2010. During autumn that same year the name was changed to 50PLUS. 

Leading up to the 2011 Dutch Senate election, 50PLUS made an agreement with the Onafhankelijke Senaatsfractie (Independent Senate Faction). The regional parties had to little seats in the Provincial council to collectively get a seat in the Senate, and the members of 50PLUS promised to vote for the OSF (Onafhankelijke Staatsfractie) to help them gain one. In return for this, 50PLUS member Kees de Lange would be the OSF's first candidate on the electoral list. On the 23rd of May 2011, he was chosen as a senator on behalf of the OSF. 50PLUS member Jan Nagel also won one seat. From than on, it was possible for individuals to become member of the party.

Electoral results

House of Representatives

Senate

European Parliament

Provincial councils

Organization

Leadership 

 Leaders
 Jan Nagel (10 January 2011 – 12 January 2012)
 Henk Krol (12 January 2012 – 4 October 2013)
 Jan Nagel (4 October 2013 – 8 October 2016)
 Henk Krol (8 October 2016 – 3 May 2020)
 Liane den Haan (3 October 2020 – 6 May 2021)
 Martin van Rooijen (17 June 2021 – )

 Chairmen
 Jan Nagel (10 January 2011 – 10 November 2012)
 Willem Holthuizen (10 November 2012 – 2 November 2013)
 Jan Nagel (2 November 2013 – 29 March 2014)
 John Struijlaard (29 March 2014 – 4 June 2016)
 Jan Nagel (4 June 2016 – 17 June 2017)
 Jan Zoetelief (17 June 2017 – 21 May 2018)
  (26 May 2018 – 1 August 2020)
 Jan Nagel (1 August 2020 – 8 May 2021)
 Peter Schut (8 May 2021 – )

 Vice Chairmen
 Henk Krol (10 January 2011 – 10 November 2012)
 Maurice Koopman (10 November 2012 – 21 May 2018)
 Paul Le Coultre (26 May 2018 – 1 August 2020)
 Parliamentary leaders in the Senate
 Jan Nagel (7 June 2011 – 11 June 2019)
 Martin van Rooijen (11 June 2019 – )

 Parliamentary leaders in the House of Representatives
 Henk Krol (20 September 2012 – 4 October 2013)
 Norbert Klein (4 October 2013 – 3 June 2014)
 Martine Baay-Timmerman (3 June 2014 – 10 September 2014)
 Henk Krol (10 September 2014 – 3 May 2020)
 Corrie van Brenk (3 May 2020 – 18 March 2021)
 Liane den Haan (18 March 2021 – 6 May 2021)
 No representation (6 May 2020 – )

Representation

House of Representatives

Senate 
Current members of the Senate since the 2019 election:

 Martin van Rooijen, parliamentary leader
 Martine Baay-Timmerman

See also
 Union 55+, Defunct Dutch pensioners' interests party active from 1992 until 1998.
 General Elderly Alliance, Defunct Dutch pensioners' interests party active from 1993 until 1998.

References 

Pensioners' parties
Identity politics
Populism in the Netherlands
Eurosceptic parties in the Netherlands
2009 establishments in the Netherlands
Political parties established in 2009
Organisations based in The Hague